In probability theory, Spitzer's formula or Spitzer's identity gives the joint distribution of partial sums and maximal partial sums of a collection of random variables. The result was first published by Frank Spitzer in 1956. The formula is regarded as "a stepping stone in the theory of sums of independent random variables".

Statement of theorem

Let  be independent and identically distributed random variables and define the partial sums . Define .  Then

where

and S± denotes (|S| ± S)/2.

Proof

Two proofs are known, due to Spitzer and Wendel.

References

Stochastic processes
Probability theorems